Michael van Vuuren (born 20 August 1958) is a South African cricketer. He played in 75 first-class and 63 List A matches from 1978/79 to 1991/92.

References

External links
 

1958 births
Living people
South African cricketers
Border cricketers
Eastern Province cricketers
Cricketers from Port Elizabeth